Johnson Township is one of nine townships in Crawford County, Indiana. As of the 2010 census, its population was 484 and it contained 225 housing units.

Geography

Unincorporated towns
 Eckerty
(This list is based on USGS data and may include former settlements.)

Adjacent townships
 Patoka Township (northeast)
 Union Township (east)
 Oil Township, Perry County (southeast)
 Clark Township, Perry County (southwest)
 Jefferson Township, Dubois County (west)

Cemeteries
The township contains four cemeteries: Blunk, Davis, Gilmore and Potter.

References
 
 United States Census Bureau cartographic boundary files

External links

 Indiana Township Association
 United Township Association of Indiana

Townships in Crawford County, Indiana
Townships in Indiana